

Keri Lighthouse (Estonian: Keri tuletorn) (previously known as Kokskäri Lighthouse) is a lighthouse in the Gulf of Finland on Keri Island.

History 
The present-day lighthouse was built in 1858.  It is a red metal cylinder topped with the lantern room and balcony which rests upon a cylindrical stone base.  This light is computer controlled, powered by solar cells and batteries.

The original wooden lighthouse was built in 1724.  It was rebuilt in the early 19th century with a stone base topped with a wooden tower.

From 1907 to 1912 it was the only lighthouse in the world to be powered by natural gas.  In 1990 the stone base began to collapse and steel reinforcements were installed.  In 2007 an internet camera was installed followed by an internet weather station in 2009.

Specifications 
During hours of darkness the light cycles with the following sequence: 13 seconds off; 2 seconds on.  The light can be seen from 11 nautical miles.

Postage stamp 
The Estonian Post Office issued a stamp commemorating the Keri Lighthouse on 15 January 2003.  First day cancel covers were also issued on that day.

Gallery

See also 

 List of lighthouses in Estonia

References

External links 

 Kinnismälestis, Arhitektuurimälestis nr 9500 Kultuurimälestiste riiklikus registris
 Keri lighthouse photo 2005
 

Lighthouses in Estonia
Lighthouses completed in 1858
Viimsi Parish
Buildings and structures in Harju County
1724 establishments in Sweden
Tourist attractions in Harju County